Ringe is an unincorporated community in Olmsted County, Minnesota, United States, near Rochester.  The community is located along 75th Street NE near 40th Avenue NE.  Ringe is located within Farmington Township and Haverhill Township.

References

Unincorporated communities in Olmsted County, Minnesota
Unincorporated communities in Minnesota